Therry is a surname.

List of people with the surname 

 John Joseph Therry (1790–1864) was an Irish Roman Catholic priest in Sydney, Australia.
 Robert Therry (born 1947), French politician
 Roger Therry (1800–1874), Irish-Australian jurist

See also 
 Terry

Surnames